2-Methyl-2-propyl-1,3-propanediol (MPP) is a simple alkyl diol which has sedative, anticonvulsant and muscle relaxant effects. It is both a synthetic precursor to, and an active metabolite of the tranquilizers meprobamate and carisoprodol, as well as other derivatives.

See also
 1,4-Butanediol
 1,6-Dioxecane-2,7-dione
 1-Ethynylcyclohexanol
 Mephenesin
 Prenderol

References

Alkanediols
Muscle relaxants